The Toronto Evening Telegram was a conservative, broadsheet afternoon newspaper published in Toronto from 1876 to 1971. It had a reputation for supporting the Conservative Party at the federal and the provincial levels. The paper competed with a newspaper supporting the Liberal Party of Ontario: The Toronto Star. The Telegram strongly supported Canada's connection with the United Kingdom and the rest of the British Empire as late as in the 1960s.

History
The Toronto Evening Telegram was founded in 1876 by publisher John Ross Robertson. He had borrowed $10,000 to buy the assets of The Liberal, a defunct newspaper, and published his first edition of 3,800 copies on April 18, 1876. The editor of Telegram from 1876 to 1888 was Alexander Fraser Pirie (1849-1903), a native of Guelph. Pirie had worked for the Guelph Herald, his father's paper.

The newspaper became the voice of working-class, conservative Protestant Orange Toronto. In 1881, Robertson erected a building for the paper at the southeast corner of King and Bay Streets, on Melinda Street. John R. Robinson succeeded Pirie as editor-in-chief in 1888 and held that position until he died in 1928.

The Telegram focused on local issues and became the largest circulation daily in Toronto, but it lost that position in 1932 to the Toronto Daily Star and never regained it. During the early 20th century, The Tely, as it was popularly known was one of the first Canadian newspapers to introduce Saturday (and in 1957 Sunday) colour comics section (which by its later years spanned two sections), and a radio (and after 1952 television) magazine with listings for the entire week. Following the death of Robertson's widow in 1947, the paper was bought by George McCullagh, the publisher of The Globe and Mail, for $3.6 million. Evening was dropped from the paper's name in 1949.

McCullagh died in 1952, and the paper was then purchased by John Bassett for $4.25 million with money borrowed from the Eaton family. In March 1957, the paper introduced a Sunday edition, the first Toronto paper to do so, and was threatened by the Attorney-General of Ontario with charges under the province's Lord's Day Act. The Sunday edition was unsuccessful and ceased publication after four months.

In December 1959, Bassett bought a  property on Front Street West and in 1963 moved the Telegram to a new building at that location from the site at Bay and Melinda Street where the paper had been produced since 1899. At the same time, Telegram Corporation acquired a majority interest in Toronto TV station CFTO-TV.

In July 1964, the International Typographical Union called a strike at the Telegram, the Star, and The Globe and Mail. All three papers continued to publish despite the strike.

The Telegram lost $635,000 in 1969 and $921,000 in 1970 and was on pace to lose another $900,000 in 1971 when it was shut down that year by Bassett on October 30, just as a strike was looming. Many employees moved to the Toronto Sun, which launched at the same time the Telegram shut down. The Telegram had its subscriber list sold to the Toronto Star for $10 million. The Star also leased the Telegram'''s Front Street facility, which was sold to The Globe and Mail.

In the book The Death of the Toronto Telegram (1971), the former Telegram writer Jock Carroll described the decline of the paper and provided many anecdotes about the Canadian newspaper business from the 1950s to 1970.

York University's library holds about 500,000 prints and 830,000 negatives of pictures taken by the Telegram's photographers. Over 13,000 images are currently searchable on line, with more appearing on a regular basis.

Notable staff members

Well-known reporters, editors, columnists and cartoonists included:

George Bain - later joined the Globe and Mail and Toronto StarIsabel Bassett - also a reporter at CFTO and wife of publisher John Bassett, later a provincial cabinet minister under Mike Harris
Jock Carroll - later an author and book editor
Greg Clark - previously a war correspondent and reporter with the Toronto Daily Star, was a humour columnist at the TelegramGordon Donaldson - reporter, later an author, television journalist and producer at CBC and CTV
Andy Donato - art director and cartoonist who was a key player in founding the Toronto SunJohn Downing - later editor-in-chief of the Toronto SunFrank Drea award-winning labour reporter, later a provincial cabinet minister under Bill Davis
Lillian Foster - fashion editor and columnist
Doug Fisher - freelance columnist while initially an NDP Member of Parliament, later joined the Toronto SunJohn Fraser - later a columnist for the  Toronto Sun, Globe and Mail, Toronto Star and National Post, editor of Saturday Night, Master of Massey College
Trent Frayne - later a sports columnist for the Toronto Sun, Globe and Mail and Maclean's MagazineClyde Gilmour - CBC Radio broadcaster and later Toronto Star movie reviewer
Dale Goldhawk - later a broadcaster at CBC, CTV and Rogers
George Gross - later Toronto Sun sports editor
Fraser Kelly - political editor, later news anchor at CFTO and CBLT
Robert Kirkland Kernighan - columnist and poet
Bob MacDonald - later a Toronto Sun columnist
J. Douglas MacFarlane - vice-president and editor-in-chief, 50 years in the newspaper business, 1949 to 1969 at the Telegram, from city editor, advancing to top editorial position
C.A. (Arnie) Patterson Later founder of CFDR and CFRQ radio, Dartmouth NS and Press Secretary to Pierre Elliott Trudeau
Ted Reeve - later at Toronto SunPaul Rimstead - later at Toronto SunJudith Robinson - contributed a daily column from 1953 to 1961. 
Margaret Scrivener - later a provincial cabinet minister under Bill Davis
Merle Shain - feature writer, later associate editor of the Chatelaine, and as a columnist for Toronto SunWalter Stewart - later at Toronto SunBert Wemp - reporter who became mayor of Toronto (1930)
Ben Wicks - cartoonist, later joined the Toronto StarPeter Worthington - played a major role in starting the Toronto Sun and served, initially, as its editor
Ritchie Yorke - later music writer for The Globe and Mail,  Canadian editor of Billboard magazine and Rolling StoneScott Young - sports reporter and father of singer Neil Young, later Globe and Mail'
Lubor J. Zink - later a Toronto Sun columnist
Jessie M. Read - Food Economist (Joined 1934) Three Meals A Day and First Cooking School Film in Canada Kitchen Talks and Radio Cooking School CKCL Toronto
Gary Ralph - covered many front-page stories including The October Crisis and Woodstock in the five years leading to the Tely's last edition. Award winner for his police reporting.

See also

 Toronto Standard 1848-49
 Toronto Star 1892 to present
 Toronto Sun 1971 to present
 The Globe and Mail 1936 to present
 The Globe 1844-1936
 The Mail and Empire 1895-1936
 The Toronto Mail 1872-1895
 Toronto Empire 1872-1895

References

Further reading

Toronto: Past and Present / A Handbook of the city.  C. Pelham Mulvany (Toronto:  W. E. Caiger Publisher, 1884). Toronto Evening Telegram history:  pp. 193–194.
Canada's Newspaper Legend: The Story of J. Douglas MacFarlane by Richard MacFarlane (Toronto: ECW Press Ltd., 2000) Newspaper History in Canada, Biography, 300 pp.

External links
Clara Thomas Archives and Special Collections, York University - Archival photographs from the Toronto Telegram fonds.

Thomas Fisher Rare Book Library, Robarts Library, University of Toronto. Archival and photograph collection of J. Douglas MacFarlane's newspaper career in Toronto.

Newspapers published in Toronto
Defunct newspapers published in Ontario
Publications established in 1876
Publications disestablished in 1971
Daily newspapers published in Ontario
1876 establishments in Ontario
1971 disestablishments in Ontario
Conservative media in Canada